The following is a list of episodes for the television series Too Close for Comfort. The first two seasons have been released on DVD by Rhino Entertainment.

Series overview

Episodes

Season 1 (1980–81)

Season 2 (1981–82)
Starting with the episode "What's Our Rush", Jim J. Bullock (Monroe Ficus) is upgraded to series regular status and appears in the opening credits from that point on (with the exception of the season two episodes "Where There's a Will", "The Remaking of Monroe" and "When the Bough Breaks", which were aired out of production order).

Season 3 (1982–83)
This season was the last to air on ABC, as it was cancelled at the end of the season due to declining ratings as a result of the show's move to Thursday nights, as part of a lineup of short-lived freshman series.

Season 4 (1984)
Beginning this season, Too Close for Comfort began airing in first-run syndication, after Metromedia Producers Corporation began distributing the series.

Season 5 (1985)
Deborah Van Valkenburgh (Jackie Rush) appears in only nine episodes ("Drawing Room", "Nearly Departed", "My Son, the PhD", "All in a Day's Unemployment", "And Baby Makes Two", "For Every Man, There's Two Women", "Finders Keepers", "These Stupid Things Remind Me Of You", and "Arrividerci, Jackie").
Joshua Goodwin takes over the role of Andrew Rush for remainder of the series, though appears in only twelve episodes over the course of the next two seasons.

Season 6 (1986–87)
This season, the series was renamed The Ted Knight Show during the original broadcast season, but in reruns the name Too Close for Comfort was used in the titles.
Lydia Cornell (Sara Rush) and Deborah Van Valkenburgh (Jackie Rush) do not appear this season, while Pat Carroll (Hope Stinson) and Lisa Antille (Lisa Flores) join the cast.

References

External links
 
 

Lists of American sitcom episodes